Modern Vidya Niketan School, Aravali Hills is a school in Faridabad, Haryana, India, which was regarded as India's best CBSE school in 2011. However, as of 2018 it is the 50th best CBSE school in India.

The school, in past has produced two IIT-JEE INR Rank 1 holders, namely Nitin Jain (2009) and Arpit Aggarwal (2012). The school regularly holds MUN's and SAARC Summits for students. It has an 8-acre campus.

See also
Education in India
Literacy in India  
List of institutions of higher education in Haryana
Modern Vidya Niketan schools

References

External links

Schools in Faridabad
CBSE Delhi